Robert Petrov (born 2 June 1978) is a Macedonian footballer who last played as a defender for Germanea Sapareva Banya.

Club career
Robert Petrov began his career in the Macedonian club FK Ovče Pole. In 1999, he signed a contract with FK Pobeda, with whom he won the 2002 Macedonian Football Cup. In June 2002 he signed for Bulgarian club Lokomotiv Plovdiv, who were the Bulgarian champions in 2004. In 2006 Petrov transferred to CSKA Sofia for a fee of 150 000 €. During the 2006/07 season, he earned 28 appearances playing in the A PFG, scored one goal and won Bulgarian Supercup. In next season Petrov do not plays football for sake bruise.

After spending six years of his career in Bulgaria, Robert Petrov relocated to Greece in June 2008, signing a contract with Panserraikos. After only six months in the Greek club he returned in Bulgaria and on 19 February signed with Slavia Sofia.

Club statistics (incomplete)

International career
He made his senior debut for Macedonia in a February 2000 friendly match against FR Yugoslavia and has earned a total of 31 caps, scoring no goals. His final international was an October 2011 European Championship qualification match against Slovakia.

Awards 
 Macedonian Football Cup 2002 (with FK Pobeda)
 Champion of Bulgaria 2004 (with Lokomotiv Plovdiv)
 Bulgarian Supercup 2006 (with CSKA Sofia)

References

External links 
 Profile at MacedonianFootball.com 
 Profile at National-Football-Teams

1978 births
Living people
People from Sveti Nikole
Association football fullbacks
Macedonian footballers
North Macedonia international footballers
FK Pobeda players
PFC Lokomotiv Plovdiv players
PFC CSKA Sofia players
Panserraikos F.C. players
PFC Slavia Sofia players
AZAL PFK players
PFC Spartak Pleven players
OFC Bdin Vidin players
Macedonian First Football League players
First Professional Football League (Bulgaria) players
Super League Greece players
Azerbaijan Premier League players
Macedonian expatriate footballers
Expatriate footballers in Bulgaria
Macedonian expatriate sportspeople in Bulgaria
Expatriate footballers in Greece
Macedonian expatriate sportspeople in Greece
Expatriate footballers in Azerbaijan
Macedonian expatriate sportspeople in Azerbaijan
Macedonian football managers
OFC Spartak Pleven managers
Macedonian expatriate football managers
Expatriate football managers in Bulgaria